Korn Live: The Encounter is a live release by the American metal band Korn, to promote their studio album Korn III: Remember Who You Are. It premiered on Sunday July 11, 2010 on HDNet, and then streamed on the band's Myspace profile. It was the band's first live album to feature drummer Ray Luzier who joined the band in 2009, as well as the second to last live album recorded as a quartet before original guitarist Brian “Head” Welch returns to the band in 2013.

Background
Although a live performance piece, the concert has no audience beyond production crew. In July, a number of viral videos were released by the band, the first two videos included amateur footage of crop circles and unidentified flying objects, while the second two included news footage of the phenomenons identifying its location as Kern County. The Korn logo could also be seen in one of the crop circles. On July 7, the band announced "Korn Live: The Encounter, A Concert for Korn III: Remember Who You Are" a live concert filmed June 24 at the crop circles. The concert would be premiered via HDNet on July 11, and the day after via MySpace.

The unusual setting for the concert was inspired by Pink Floyd's Live at Pompeii concert, the 80-minute concert included several new songs from the upcoming album, as well as older songs and fan favorites. Davis noted that "the setting and the mood took us into a totally new direction musically. We took the opportunity to stretch out and experiment with the performance" while Shaffer described it as "a new frontier musically for Korn". "Need To" and "Coming Undone" were cut from the final broadcast. Clips of the performance from "Let the Guilt Go" were used in the music video of the song.

The DVD version was released on December 6, 2011 as a bonus disc with the special edition of Korn's tenth studio release, The Path of Totality. It includes the full concert; unlike the broadcast which cut songs "Need To" and "Coming Undone", and will feature band interviews about the concert and their new album. The DVD is over 2 hours in length.

Track listing
Filmed on June 24, 2010 in Bakersfield, California.  http://wikimapia.org/#lat=35.1972955&lon=-119.0003868&z=17&l=1&m=b

{{Track listing
|collapsed = yes
| headline      = DVD Version Tracklist
| title1        = Intro / Uber-Time
| note1         = from KIII: Remember Who You Are
| title2        = Oildale (Leave Me Alone)
| note2         = from KIII: Remember Who You Are
| title3        = Pop a Pill
| note3         = from KIII: Remember Who You Are
| title4        = Inspiration
| note4         = Band Interview
| title5        = Need To
| note5         = from Korn
| title6        = Coming Undone
| note6         = from See You on the Other Side
| title7        = Bakersfield
| note7         = Band Interview
| title8        = Let the Guilt Go
| note8         = from KIII: Remember Who You Are
| title9        = Here to Stay
| note9         = from Untouchables
| title10        = Falling Away from Me
| note10         = from Issues| title11        = Crazy Heavy Shit
| note11         = Band Interview| title12        = Jam #1
| note12         = Band Jam Session| title13        = Throw Me Away
| note13         = from See You on the Other Side| title14        = Jam #2
| note14         = Band Jam Session| title15        = Move On
| note15         = from KIII: Remember Who You Are| title16        = Crop Circles
| note16         = Band Interview| title17        = The Past
| note17         = from KIII: Remember Who You Are| title18        = Jam #3
| note18         = Band Jam Session| title19        = Freak on a Leash
| note19         = from Follow the Leader| title20        = Jam #4
| note20         = Band Jam Session| title21        = Are You Ready to Live?
| note21         = from KIII: Remember Who You Are| title22        = Line-Up Changes
| note22         = Band Interview| title23        = Jam #5
| note23         = Band Jam Session| title24        = Shoots and Ladders
| note24         = from Korn| title25        = I'm Happy Right Now
| note25         = Band Interview| title26        = Clown
| note26         = from Korn| title27        = Got the Life
| note27         = from Follow the Leader}}

Personnel
Jonathan Davis – vocals, bagpipes,
Reginald "Fieldy" Arvizu – bass,
James "Munky" Shaffer – guitar, 
Ray Luzier – drums and percussion
with:
Zac Baird – keyboards,
Shayne Gibson – additional guitar,

Additional information
 Directed by Russell Thomas
 Edited by Jeff Richter
 Shot and filmed in Bakersfield, California

See also
 Korn III: Remember Who You Are "Oildale (Leave Me Alone)"
 "Let the Guilt Go"The Path of Totality''

References

Korn video albums
2010 live albums
2010 video albums
Live video albums
Roadrunner Records live albums
Roadrunner Records video albums